Abu Kanu, commonly known as Gbanaloko, (born  31 March 1972 in Magburaka) is a retired Sierra Leonean football striker. Kanu was a member of the Leone Stars squad that participated in the 1994 African Nations Cup in Tunisia. He is the second highest all-time goal scorer for the Sierra Leone national football team with 15 goals, an during his playing days with Sierra Leone, Kanu was most prolific scorer in the team.

Kanu had a spell with NK Slaven Belupo in the Prva HNL.

References

External links

1972 births
Living people
Temne people
Sierra Leonean footballers
Sierra Leone international footballers
1994 African Cup of Nations players
1996 African Cup of Nations players
Association football midfielders
Expatriate footballers in Sweden
Penang F.C. players
Expatriate footballers in Malaysia
NK Slaven Belupo players
Croatian Football League players
Expatriate footballers in Croatia
Sierra Leonean expatriate sportspeople in Malaysia
Sierra Leonean expatriate sportspeople in Sweden
Spånga IS players
People from Tonkolili District